The 2012 South Carolina Gamecocks football team represented the University of South Carolina in the 2012 NCAA Division I FBS football season. The Gamecocks were led by eighth-year head coach Steve Spurrier and played their home games at Williams-Brice Stadium. They were a member of the East Division of the Southeastern Conference. The season finished with 11–2, 6–2 in SEC to finish in third place in the East Division. They reached No. 3 in the AP Poll, their highest ranking since 1984 and not matched since then. They were invited to the Outback Bowl, where the Gamecocks defeated Michigan 33–28 by a game-winning TD with 11 seconds remaining in the game.

Preseason
On April 14, 2012, the Black squad defeated the Garnet squad, 38–24, in the annual Garnet & Black Spring Game, in front of a crowd of 34,513. Quarterback Connor Shaw finished the day 6–7 for 128 yards and two touchdowns for the Black team, while Garnet QB Dylan Thompson was 15–20 for 168 yards and a rushing touchdown.

Schedule
The October 6 game against Georgia played host to ESPN's College GameDay, the school's sixth time hosting the popular ESPN show.

‡ New Williams–Brice Stadium Attendance Record

Game summaries

Vanderbilt

East Carolina

UAB

Missouri

Kentucky

Georgia

LSU

Florida

Tennessee

Arkansas

Wofford

Clemson

Michigan

Players

Depth chart
Projected starters and primary backups versus Clemson on November 24, 2012.

Awards
 Jadeveon Clowney – SEC Defensive Lineman of the Week, 9/17/12; SEC Defensive Lineman of the Week, 10/1/12; SEC Defensive Lineman and Co-Defensive Player of the Week, 11/26/12
 T.J. Johnson - SEC Offensive Lineman of the Week, 10/8/12
 Marcus Lattimore – SEC Offensive Player of the Week, 9/3/12
 Ace Sanders - SEC Co-Special Teams Player of the Week, 9/24/12, SEC Co-Special Teams Player of the Week, 10/8/12
 Connor Shaw - SEC Co-Offensive Player of the Week, 9/24/12, SEC Offensive Player of the Week, 10/29/12
 D. J. Swearinger - Walter Camp National Defensive Player of the Week, 11/11/12

Rankings

Coaching staff
 Steve Spurrier – Head coach
 Lorenzo Ward – Defensive coordinator
 Kirk Botkin - Linebackers, spurs coach
 Grady Brown - Secondary coach, assistant special teams coordinator
 Shawn Elliott – Co-offensive coordinator, offensive line coach
 Brad Lawing – Defensive line coach
 G.A. Mangus – Quarterbacks coach
 Joe Robinson - Special teams coordinator, tight ends coach
 Everette Sands - Running backs coach
 Steve Spurrier Jr. – Recruiting coordinator, wide receivers coach

References

South Carolina
South Carolina Gamecocks football seasons
ReliaQuest Bowl champion seasons
South Carolina Gamecocks football